Splügen (Romansh: Spleia, Italian: Spluga) is a former municipality in the Viamala Region in the Swiss canton of Graubünden.  On 1 January 2006 Splügen incorporated its neighbouring municipality of Medels im Rheinwald. On 1 January 2019 the former municipalities of Hinterrhein, Nufenen and Splügen merged to form the new municipality of Rheinwald.

In 1995, the Swiss Heritage Society bestowed the Wakker Prize to Splügen.

History
Splügen is first mentioned about 840 as cella in Speluca.

Geography

Of this area, 38.3% is used for agricultural purposes, while 17.8% is forested. Of the rest of the land, 1% is settled (buildings or roads) and the remainder (42.9%) is non-productive (rivers, glaciers or mountains).

Before 2017, the municipality was located in the Rheinwald sub-district, of the Hinterrhein district, after 2017 it was part of the Viamala Region.  It consists of the village of Splügen and since 1 January 2006, Medels im Rheinwald.  It is a haufendorf (an irregular, unplanned and quite closely packed village, built around a central square) located on a ridge between the Splügen pass and San Bernardino pass.

The Italian name for the pass is Passo dello Spluga. The pass is closed in winter nowadays and the whole route hosts a number of historically interesting spots that can be reached on a common multiday hike between Thusis and Chiavenna, passing the two gorges Roflaschlucht and Viamala north of Splügen.

Demographics
, 10.7% of the population was made up of foreign nationals. Over the last 10 years the population has decreased at a rate of -8.3%.

, the gender distribution of the population was 50.0% male and 50.0% female.  The age distribution, in Splügen is; 25 people or 13.2% of the population are between 0 and 9 years old.  22 people or 11.6% are 10 to 14, and 3 people or 1.6% are 15 to 19.  Of the adult population, 8 people or 4.2% of the population are between 20 and 29 years old.  35 people or 18.5% are 30 to 39, 20 people or 10.6% are 40 to 49, and 15 people or 7.9% are 50 to 59.  The senior population distribution is 28 people or 14.8% of the population are between 60 and 69 years old, 21 people or 11.1% are 70 to 79, there are 11 people or 5.8% who are 80 to 89, and there are 1 people or 0.5% who are 90 to 99.

In the 2007 federal election the most popular party was the SVP which received 47.6% of the vote.  The next three most popular parties were the FDP (23.4%), the SPS (22.6%) and the CVP (6.2%).

In Splügen about 67.6% of the population (between age 25-64) have completed either non-mandatory upper secondary education or additional higher education (either university or a Fachhochschule).

Splügen has an unemployment rate of 0.33%.  , there were 39 people employed in the primary economic sector and about 16 businesses involved in this sector.  27 people are employed in the secondary sector and there are 6 businesses in this sector.  150 people are employed in the tertiary sector, with 30 businesses in this sector.

The historical population is given in the following table:

Languages
Most of the population speaks German (89.8%), with Italian being second most common (2.7%) and Portuguese being third (2.4%).

Tourism

Skiing
Splügen, in the winter, is a ski resort with a lift going in the direction of the Splügen Pass.

Heritage sites of national significance

The former Säumerherberge (mule drivers hostel) Weiss Kreuz is listed as a Swiss heritage sites of national significance.

Wakker Prize
In 1995, the Swiss Heritage Society bestowed the Wakker Prize to Splügen.  The prize description notes that Splügen had reached a notable compromise between preservation and tourism.  The old town was strictly protected to maintain the original appearance, while rational zone planning allowed development to occur outside the old village.

References

External links
Official Web site

Rheinwald
Former municipalities of Graubünden
Cities in Switzerland
Ski areas and resorts in Switzerland
Cultural property of national significance in Graubünden